Dicraeus is a genus of fies in the family Chloropidae.

References

External links
Europe
Nearctic

Oscinellinae
Chloropidae genera